Vail Bloom is an American actress and producer. She portrayed the character Heather Stevens on The Young and the Restless, for which she received a Daytime Emmy nomination. Bloom has also appeared in television guest roles, independent films, and reality television series Vanderpump Rules. Bloom graduated Princeton University with a Bachelor's Degree in architecture.

Early life and education
Bloom was born in Boston, Massachusetts and grew up in Connecticut and Florida. The daughter of a high school counselor and businessman/college professor, Bloom graduated from Princeton University with a Bachelor's Degree in architecture.

In 2003, Bloom placed third in Maxim list of "Hometown Hotties", though she has declined offers for similar shots with other magazines. She became interested in acting when a fellow student at Princeton asked her to star in a short film.

Career
Bloom played the role of assistant district attorney Heather Stevens on the CBS soap opera The Young and the Restless from 2007 to 2010, a role for which she received a Daytime Emmy nomination in 2008. In March 2009, she appeared on the web series Angel of Death.

Bloom appeared in the 2015 film Too Late. In January 2023, it was announced she would reprise the role of Heather Stevens.

Personal life 
In 2014, Bloom admitted that she had a drug problem during her years on The Young and the Restless. “I was on The Young and the Restless for just under three years and I was starting to get into this whole like… what seemed like the Hollywood lifestyle, and I was starting to get into a little bit of trouble with drugs,” Bloom said in an episode of Vanderpump Rules.

In February 2018, Bloom filed for a restraining order against ex-boyfriend Hayes Stuppy after he allegedly stole items from her and destroyed them, showed up uninvited to her house on multiple occasions, and sent her over 183 emails. Bloom claimed that she dated Hayes Stuppy in 2017 for three weeks.

Bloom has two children, Charlie (born in August 2018) and Jack (born in January 2020).

Filmography

Accolades

References

External links

Vail Bloom on FameGame.com

American television actresses
American soap opera actresses
Princeton University School of Architecture alumni
Living people
Year of birth missing (living people)
21st-century American women